The Riverside Ballroom in Green Bay, Wisconsin, is a ballroom that hosts weddings and small concerts. In the past, it has also held boxing matches. The Ballroom was the largest indoor venue in Green Bay until the Brown County Veterans Memorial Arena opening in 1958.

History 
Founded in 1936, Riverside became locally known as one of the last venues for the Winter Dance Party tour that led to the Day the Music Died. The concert was played on February 1, 1959, two days before the crash in which Buddy Holly, Ritchie Valens and The Big Bopper died.

The building is designed in the art modern style of the 1930s. It was intended to give the impression of machinery or technology. It has high wood beams and the Czechoslovakian crystal chandeliers. It is recognized by the city of Green Bay as a historic site.

Acts that have performed at the venue include Guy Lombardo, Glenn Miller, Jimmy Dorsey, Lawrence Welk, Ritchie Valens / The Big Bopper and Wayne King. More recent acts include Red Hot Chili Peppers, Joan Jett, Night Ranger, Black Flag, Dead Kennedys, Clutch, ALL, Killswitch Engage, Fugazi, Bachman–Turner Overdrive, Kenny Wayne Shepherd and The Guess Who.

References

External links
 Riverside Ballroom

Music venues in Wisconsin
Buildings and structures in Green Bay, Wisconsin
Culture of Green Bay, Wisconsin